Gerard Muñoz Nicolás (born 22 February 1993) is a Spanish footballer who plays for CE Farners as a forward.

Football career
Born in Girona, Catalonia, Muñoz finished his graduation with Girona FC's youth setup, and made his senior debuts while on loan at Palamós CF in the 2012–13 campaign, in Tercera División.

In October 2012, Muñoz returned to the Albirrojos and was assigned to the reserves in the regional leagues. On 5 January of the following year he played his first match as a professional, coming on as a late substitute in a 1–1 home draw against SD Ponferradina, in the Segunda División championship.

On 2 September 2014 Muñoz joined CE Farners, also in his native region.

In the 2015 summer he joined the Tercera División side AEC Manlleu.

References

External links

1993 births
Living people
Sportspeople from Girona
Spanish footballers
Footballers from Catalonia
Association football forwards
Segunda División players
Tercera División players
Girona FC B players
Palamós CF footballers
Girona FC players